

The Children's Crusade, or Children's March, was a march by over 5,000 school students in Birmingham, Alabama on May 2–10, 1963. Initiated and organized by Rev. James Bevel, the purpose of the march was to walk downtown to talk to the mayor about segregation in their city. Many children left their schools and were arrested, set free, and then arrested again the next day. The marches were stopped by the head of police, Bull Connor, who brought fire hoses to ward off the children and set police dogs after the children.  This event compelled President John F. Kennedy to publicly support federal civil rights legislation and eventually led to the passage of the Civil Rights Act of 1964.

Malcolm X and Dr. Martin Luther King Jr. were both opposed to the event because they thought it would expose the children to violence.

Background 
Although the Civil Rights Movement had been active under Dr. Martin Luther King's leadership, little progress was being made following the dramatic gains of 1960 and 1961. After some major legal victories, the movement was beginning to stagnate. President Kennedy supported civil rights but held back from introducing his own bill and King was running out of options. He looked to Birmingham where African Americans lived segregated and in fear as second class citizens. In January 1963, Dr. King arrived to organize nonviolent protests such as marches and sit-ins. The goal; get a reaction from the racist officials that would not only spotlight the injustice of the south but gain national attention and support. 

However, authorities adapted to his nonviolent approach. Drastic measures were then taken by SCLC's James Bevel before Dr. King abandoned Birmingham. Children would march instead. During the march the real south showed its ugly side, giving Dr. King and the Civil Rights Movement the jolt and leverage it needed to accomplish its ultimate goal.

Event 
On May 2, 1963, thousands of children gathered at Sixteenth Street Baptist Church in place of their parents, who, under Alabama law and social oppression, faced harsh penalties such as loss of their jobs and jail time if they protested the racist and unjust segregation laws of Alabama. 

In response to the mass arrests of the children, Commissioner of Public Safety, Bull Connor, finally ordered police to use police dogs, high-pressure fire hoses, batons, and arrest these children if "deemed" necessary. Despite this harsh treatment, children still participated in the marches. On May 5, protestors marched to the city jail where many young people were being held and continued practicing their tactics of non-violent demonstrations. Jail cells were filled to capacity with children, and there were not enough police to manage the children.

Federal response 
Before the Children's March, federal response was limited in an effort to balance federal authority and state rights. The Children's March played a pivotal role in ending legal segregation, as the media coverage of the event further brought the plight of Southern African Americans to the national stage. After additional measures were taken, President Kennedy could not avoid the issue, and on June 11, 1963, presented his intentions to establish new federal civil rights legislation and ended segregation in Birmingham:

Aftermath 
After the march, the Civil Rights Movement regained momentum, and on August 28 Dr. King led the March on Washington where he delivered his famous "I Have a Dream" speech. But on September 15, the Ku Klux Klan bombed the 16th Street Baptist Church, killing four African American girls, and on November 22 President Kennedy was assassinated. It was President Lyndon B. Johnson who saw the controversial 1964 Civil Rights Act through, a victory for the Civil Rights Movement made possible because of the children of Birmingham.

The children who died in the church bombing were Addie Mae Collins, Cynthia Wesley, and Carole Robertson, all 14, and Denise McNair, 11.

See also
 Timeline of the civil rights movement
 Mighty Times: The Children's March
 American Heroes Channel: "What History Forgot" Season 2, Episode 5

References

Further reading
Reading
 Clayborne Carson, ed., The Autobiography of Martin Luther King, Jr., (New York, NY: Warner Books, Inc., 1998)
 
 M. S. Handler, "Malcolm X Terms Dr. King’s Tactics Futile," The New York Times, May 11, 1963

Folk music
 Phil Ochs, song, Talking Birmingham Jam, performed at the Newport Folk Festival, July 26–28, 1963, released on Newport Broadside, 1964 and Live at Newport, 1966

External links
 Children's Crusade in the King Encyclopedia
 The Birmingham Campaign – Civil Rights Movement Archive

1963 in Alabama
African-American history in Birmingham, Alabama
Civil rights movement
Civil rights protests in the United States
History of African-American civil rights
History of Alabama
History of Birmingham, Alabama
Protests in Alabama
Protest marches
Student protests in the United States